The year 1905 was marked, in science fiction, by the following events.

Births and deaths

Births 
 January 6: Eric Frank Russell, British writer (d. 1978)
 July 5: Günther Krupkat, German writer (d. 1990)

Deaths 
 March 24: Jules Verne, French writer, (b. 1828)

Literary releases

Short stories 
 Rudyard Kipling, "With the Night Mail" (American and British magazine publication).
  Three Thousand Years Among the Microbes, short story by Mark Twain.

See also 
 1905 in science
 1904 in science fiction
 1906 in science fiction

References

science-fiction
Science fiction by year